The Church of Saint Clare in Vigna Clara is a Catholic titular church in Rome, Italy, built as a parish church by decree of Cardinal Clemente Micara. In 1969 Pope Paul VI granted it a titular church as a seat for Cardinals.

The present Cardinal Priest of the Titulus Sancta Clarae ad Vineam Claram is Vinko Puljić.

Architecture

The church is circular, and is based on the structure of the church of Santo Stefano Rotondo. Behind the altar is a series of paintings, which include scenes of the Nativity and the Annunciation, all done by Mariano Villalta.

List of Cardinal Priests 
 Gordon Joseph Gray (30 April 1969 – 19 July 1993)
 Vinko Puljić (26 November 1994 – Present)

References

Sources
 
 M. R. Grifone - C. Rendina, Quartiere XVIII. Tor di Quinto, in AA.VV, I quartieri di Roma, Newton & Compton Editori, Roma 2006

External links
 Catholic hierarchy

Chiara
20th-century Roman Catholic church buildings in Italy
Rome Q. XV Della Vittoria